Frank Porter (9 April 1882 – 20 June 1965) was a South African cricketer. He played in eleven first-class matches from 1908/09 to 1926/27.

References

External links
 

1882 births
1965 deaths
South African cricketers
Border cricketers
Eastern Province cricketers
Gauteng cricketers
Cricketers from Cape Town